Khomeyn is a city in Markazi Province, Iran.

Khomeyn or Khumain may also refer to:
 Khumain, Hamadan
 Khomeyn, Khuzestan
 Khomeyn, Razavi Khorasan
 Khomeyn County, in Markazi Province